John Bonner may refer to:

John Bonner (businessman), British businessman
John Bonner (cricketer) (1869–1936), English cricketer
John Tyler Bonner (1920–2019), biology professor at Princeton, specialist in slime molds
John W. Bonner (1902–1970), governor of Montana